Iniistius baldwini, the Baldwin's razorfish, is a species of marine ray-finned fish from the family Labridae, the wrasses. it is found in the Western Central Pacific.

Etymology
The fish is named in honor of Albertus Baldwin (1865-1935), who while employed by the U.S. Government's Departments of Agriculture, Interior and Commerce, illustrated scientific reports, with his paintings of American and Hawaiian fishes.

References

baldwini
Taxa named by David Starr Jordan
Taxa named by Barton Warren Evermann
Fish described in 1903